Vikramjit Singh Sahney (born 20 February 1962) also known as Vikram Sahney, a Member of Parliament, Rajya Sabha from Punjab is a Social entrepreneur, educationist, philanthropist and social activist. Vikramjit Sahney is the founder and chairman of Sun Foundation- An NGO aimed at helping the incapacitated and underprivileged of the society. He  has been conferred with one of the highest civic honour of Padma Shri by the Hon'ble President of India Smt. Pratibha Patil for his extraordinary contribution towards the welfare of society at large.

A true visionary, Vikramjit Sahney  is a multifaceted personality, playing many roles with panache. He is a force to reckon with, not just because he is a self-made person and having achieved success rising from grass root level by sheer hard work but also because of his charismatic personality that is a motivation for many. 

His academic credentials include Masters in Economics as well as in Business Administration. He is currently pursuing Public Leadership credential from Harvard School of Business

As International President, World Punjabi Organisation (WPO) - a non-political international body to bring about 'Punjabi Renaissance' with Shri I.K. Gujral, former Prime Minister of India as its Chief Patron, he has been a catalyst in outreach of WPO to over 22 countries including UK, US, Canada, Middle East, South Africa, Thailand, Singapore and SAARC Nations to foster social, economic & cultural bondage. He formed World Punjabi Parliamentarian Forum; led various friendship delegations; organized annual Punjabi conferences; produced and showcased light & sound shows like 'Bole So Nihal' , 'Guru Manyo Granth' & 'Sarbansdani; scholarships to students, celebrating Guru Nanak Devji's birthday celebrations at President & Prime Minister's house, instrumental in installing an equestrian statue of Sher - e - Punjab Maharaja Ranjit Singh in Parliament House of India etc.

Mr. Sahney has dedicated himself towards creating a humane & equitable society through his NGO- Sun Foundation. Sun Foundation has set up a  World Class Skill Centre in New Delhi and Amritsar. These multi skilling centres with international standards, imparts World Class Skill courses for Indian/ global needs supported by Industry. The Centre has the capacity of training approximately 2000 students per year. We endevour to position the successfully certified students for 100% placement opportunity. 

Mr Sahney launched selfless service during covid pandemic by donating Artificial Intelligence enable Corona Mobile Testing Clinic and Life Ambulance in Delhi-NCR and state of Punjab. He donated a PSA Oxygen plant to GMERS Hospital, Gandhinagar on SOS basis for rural areas of Punjab and donated 1000 oxygen concentrators free of charge in Delhi, Punjab, various Gurdwaras, Golden Temple - Amritsar and various Red Cross Societies.

Mr. Sahney evacuated over 500 Afghan Hindus and Sikhs by sending 3 chartered flights and rehabilitating them under programme “” by bearing their monthly household expenses, free Medical and Health Insurance, education and skilling of their children. 

The projects of Sun Foundation duly recognized by NSDC include Surya Kiran - free vocational and skill development training to underprivileged women and girls; Beti Bachao Beti Padhao Campaign to raise strong concern about exacerbating sex discrimination and female feticide through awareness campaigns and Public interest messages; Running Govt. Drug Rehabilitation centers in Amritsar, Taran Taran & Jalandhar; Taare Zameen Par - free skill development centers for disabled needy youth; Angels of Sun -: scholarship to underprivileged children; adopted Shivkarwadi & Suvidha Chawl in Mumbai under Swachh Bharat Abhiyan; extending aid to Children of poor widows, war victims, families of farmers who committed suicide in Vidharbha as also national disasters like tsunami;  at Gurdwara Bangla Sahib, highlighting the life of Sikh Gurus and key tenets of Sikhism through Paintings, Murals, Translites, audio/video and several others projects. 

As a former President ICC Paris-India, Mr. Sahney's endeavour has been to enable & strengthen

business worldwide to secure peace, prosperity and opportunity for all. He is committed to take forward the agenda of ICC, through continued deep engagements with the United Nations (UN), WTO and other Multilateral Organisations, to shape the international policy landscape on behalf of its members worldwide.

As a former Honorary Consul General of South Africa, Mr. Sahney's responsibilities are directed towards development of commercial, economic, cultural and social relations between India and South Africa and also promote friendly relations between the two.

As Chair, BRICS Agri Business Forum, Mr. Sahney has also made observations and given presentation before the Heads of States of all BRICS Nations underlining the need to take firm steps to tackle the global food crisis, promote global economic recovery and initiatives on food security to boost economic growth. 

Mr. Sahney has been in  Board of National Skill Development Corporation (NSDC); a former Trustee India Brand Equity Foundation, Ministry of Commerce, Govt. of India, Member Board of Trade, Govt. of India, Member India-UAE Joint Task Force, Board Member – Muntajat (Govt. of Qatar) India, Board member – FICCI & ASSOCHEM, Chair - India Africa Business Forum, Chair – India-Arab Council, Secretary General – Maharaja Ranjit Singh Trust.

Mr. Sahney is a passionate Sufi Singer  with many Albums to his credit.

References

External links
 Umusicindia.com
 Nritoday.net
 Theloombafoundation.org
 Thesouthasiantimes.info
 Sikharts.com

 

  
  

Living people
Businesspeople from Delhi
20th-century Indian educational theorists
Recipients of the Padma Shri in social work
1962 births
Aam Aadmi Party politicians
Rajya Sabha members from Aam Aadmi Party